Ansco Company Charles Street Factory Buildings, also known as Agfa-Ansco, General Aniline and Film (GAF), and Anitec, is a historic factory complex located at Binghamton, Broome County, New York.  They are two early factory buildings built in 1910–1911, and a warehouse built in 1953–1954.  The larger building measures approximately 45 feet wide and 230 feet long.  It is a three-story, rectangular brick heavy timber frame building.  The powerhouse is a two-story, reinforced concrete and steel brick building measuring 60 feet square.  The buildings housed manufacturing operations of Ansco for photographic paper.

It was listed on the National Register of Historic Places in 2012.

References

Industrial buildings and structures on the National Register of Historic Places in New York (state)
Industrial buildings completed in 1911
Buildings and structures in Binghamton, New York
National Register of Historic Places in Broome County, New York